Edouard Kiove Kola is a Congolese politician who has been Minister of Justice in the Cabinet of the Democratic Republic of the Congo since December 2016. He is a Union for the Congolese Nation Member of the National Assembly.

References

Year of birth missing (living people)
Living people
Members of the National Assembly (Democratic Republic of the Congo)
Government ministers of the Democratic Republic of the Congo
Union for the Congolese Nation politicians
Place of birth missing (living people)
21st-century Democratic Republic of the Congo people